The Boyds Corner Reservoir is a small reservoir in  Putnam County, New York. It is in the town of Kent, New York, and is about 50 miles (80 kilometers) north of New York City. It is the northernmost reservoir in the Croton River watershed, but is not part of the New York City water supply system's Croton Watershed. and was formed by impounding the middle of the West Branch of the Croton River, submerging the village of Boyds Corner.

History
Completed in 1872, the Boyds Corner Dam saw the use of concrete in dam construction for the first time since the Ancient Romans. It was put into service in 1873, 78 feet high, making the Boyds Corner Reservoir the City's second oldest, after the New Croton Reservoir. Originally constructed as part of the City's Croton Watershed system, Boyds Corner today serves mainly as part of the Catskill/Delaware water supply system.

It spans portions of the Towns of Carmel and Putnam Valley in Putnam County, and East Fishkill in Dutchess County.

The reservoir can hold . This makes it one of the smaller in New York City's water supply system. Water from Boyds Corner flows briefly into the West Branch of the Croton River, then continues southeast to enter the West Branch Reservoir, where it mixes with water carried from the Rondout Reservoir west of the Hudson River by the Delaware Aqueduct.

Water from the West Branch Reservoir then continues via the aqueduct on to the Kensico Reservoir, which also receives a supply from the Catskill system through the Catskill Aqueduct. After settling at Kensico, the water flows through two aqueducts to the Hillview Reservoir in Yonkers, where it enters the City's distribution system.

Any water in excess of New York City's needs at the West Branch Reservoir is diverted over a spillway back into the West Branch of the Croton River, whence it becomes part of the City's Croton Watershed.  It is then mixed with water from the Middle Branch of the Croton River at the Croton Falls Reservoir.  Flow then briefly returns to the West Branch of the Croton River before reaching a confluence with the Croton River proper.  This continues southwest to the New Croton Reservoir.  Any water in excess of the City's needs there then goes over the New Croton Dam back into the Croton River, where it carried until discharging into the Hudson River at Croton-on-Hudson, New York.

After the Teton Dam failure on the Snake River in Idaho, all dams in the United States were inspected for weaknesses and deterioration. In the 1980s it was discovered that the hundred-plus year-old Boyds Corner Dam needed to be replaced. In spite of opposition by those who believed the dam was in good condition, it was dismantled and the basin stood empty until the new dam was completed in 1990 and the reservoir refilled to capacity . The reconstruction included the addition of a new spillway with a 6.1m wide flip bucket in the central dam section and the use of post-tensioned anchors to increase dam stability.

Notes

References

External links 
 NYCDEP Water Supply Watersheds-Links to information on reservoirs by system
 ASCE History of the Croton Water Supply System

Croton Watershed
Reservoirs in New York (state)
Protected areas of Putnam County, New York
Reservoirs in Putnam County, New York
1872 establishments in New York (state)